Fatjon Tafaj (born 19 March 1982) is an Albanian football coach and former player, who is currently the co-assistant coach of Partizani, alongside fellow manager Dritan Mehmeti.

Club career
In December 2012, Tafaj agreed personal terms and made a second return at his boyhood club Partizani Tirana, now in Albanian First Division, by signing until the end of the season. He started the second part of 2012–13 season by playing full-90 minutes in a 2–1 win at Butrinti Sarandë.

On 13 August 2013, Tafaj joined fellow capital side Dinamo Tirana on a one-year contract. He made his official debut later that month by starting in the 3–2 away loss to Veleçiku Koplik in the opening week of 2013–14 Albanian First Division.

In January 2014, Tafaj returned to Kamza as a player-coach.

International career
Tafaj has been a former member of Albania youth side, playing three matches for under-18 squad in 2000 and one match for under-21 in 2002.

Managerial career
On 31 July 2016, Tafaj was named as assistant coach of Ernest Gjoka at Kukësi.

References

External links
Profile - FSHF

1982 births
Living people
Footballers from Tirana
Albanian footballers
Association football central defenders
Albania youth international footballers
Albania under-21 international footballers
FK Partizani Tirana players
KF Elbasani players
KS Lushnja players
KS Shkumbini Peqin players
FC Kamza players
KF Laçi players
FK Dinamo Tirana players
Kategoria Superiore players
Kategoria e Parë players